Yarelys Barrios Castañeda (also Yarelis Barrios Castañeda; born July 12, 1983, in Pinar del Río) is a discus thrower from Cuba.

Career
She won the Diamond Race in the women's discus throw of the IAAF Diamond League both in 2010 and in 2011.

She won the 2012 Cuban National Championships with a personal best throw of 68.03 metres.

Barrios finished the Olympic discus competition in 2008 in the second place, but was disqualified by the IOC on September 1, 2016, because of doping due to a sample reanalysis which resulted in a positive test for the prohibited substance Acetazolamide.

Barrios sold her Olympic silver medal on auction site, eBay, for unknown reasons, and it was bought for $11,000 (£9,000).

Achievements

Barrios originally finished 4th in the 2012 Summer Olympics, but she moved up a position after Darya Pishchalnikova was disqualified for testing positive for the anabolic steroid oxandrolone.

References

External links

Tilastopaja biography
Yarelis Barrios Castañeda at EcuRed 

1983 births
Living people
Doping cases in athletics
Cuban female discus throwers
Athletes (track and field) at the 2007 Pan American Games
Athletes (track and field) at the 2008 Summer Olympics
Athletes (track and field) at the 2011 Pan American Games
Athletes (track and field) at the 2012 Summer Olympics
Olympic athletes of Cuba
People from Pinar del Río
World Athletics Championships medalists
Medalists at the 2012 Summer Olympics
Pan American Games gold medalists for Cuba
Olympic bronze medalists for Cuba
Olympic bronze medalists in athletics (track and field)
Cuban sportspeople in doping cases
Competitors stripped of Summer Olympics medals
Pan American Games medalists in athletics (track and field)
Universiade medalists in athletics (track and field)
Universiade gold medalists for Cuba
Diamond League winners
IAAF World Athletics Final winners
Medalists at the 2011 Pan American Games
Central American and Caribbean Games medalists in athletics
20th-century Cuban women
20th-century Cuban people
21st-century Cuban women